Tyrants Blood are a thrash/death metal band from Vancouver, British Columbia, Canada.

History

Tyrants Blood was created in 2005 by former members of black metal band Blasphemy, along with members of cult thrash bands Witches Hammer, Infernäl Mäjesty, Omega Crom, and grind act Abuse.  In 2006 the band's self-titled first album was released.

In 2009, with new lead vocalist Brian Langley, who had recently left Infernäl Mäjesty, they released Crushing Onward into Oblivion. and in 2013  "Into the Kingdom of Graves". The fast pace of their later albums gained them a reputation as a "speed metal" band.

Line-up
Brian Langley - vocals
Vinnie Borden - bass and vocals
Marco Banco - guitar(Witches Hammer\Blasphemy)
Matt Modder - drums (Abuse\Crackwhore)

Former members
Tom Lewko-guitar 2006-2010
Andrew Russell-vocals 2006-2008(Tyrants Blood ST/2006,Prophecy E.P. 2008)
Shawn Darksoul-vocals 2006
Mike Wetherick-Bass 2006
Kevin O'Driscoll-drums 2006-2007(Tyrants Blood ST 2006)

Discography
Tyrants Blood (full-length, 2006)
Tyrannous Mutations of Sathanas (split, 2008)
Prophecy (EP, 2008)
Crushing Onward Into Oblivion (full-length, 2009)
Into The Kingdom Of Graves (full-length, 2013)

References

External links
 Tyrants Blood @ Encyclopaedia Metallum
 Tyrants Blood Myspace
 Official website

Musical groups from Vancouver
Musical groups established in 2005
Canadian death metal musical groups
Canadian thrash metal musical groups
2005 establishments in British Columbia